Deadman Lake is a lake near the northern edge of Uintah County, Utah, United States.

Description
The lake, elevation , is located in the Uintah Mountains within the Ashley National Forest at the western foot of Mount Untermann. A stream which flows west down the western face of Mount Untermann and Deadman Lake constitute the headwaters of Dry Fork (which flows in southeast and into Ashley Creek, at a point east of Steinaker Reservoir).

Deadman Lake was named in memory of a man who died of exposure at the lake while spending the winter there.

See also

 List of lakes in Utah

References

Lakes of Utah
Lakes of Uintah County, Utah
Features of the Uinta Mountains